Life Mein Kabhi Kabhiee (transl. At Times in Life) is a 2007 Bollywood social thriller movie, directed by Vikram Bhatt. It was released on 13 April 2007. Boxofficeindia declared the movie box office disaster. Actor Sameer Dattani's role of a politician was highly appreciated.

Plot
The film begins with Manish Gupta (Aftab Shivdasani) in a press conference of his best-selling book Life Mein Kabhie Kabhiee.

It then goes into a flashback where five friends (including him) — Rajeev Arora (Dino Morea), Jai Gokhale (Sameer Dattani), Ishita Sharma (Anjori Alagh) and Monica Seth (Nauheed Cyrusi) — are fresh out of college. They are caught drunk and are in a lock-up. In the meantime they make a bet to determine who will find the most fulfillment in life. The winner will be the person who has found the most happiness in life within five years.

Rajeev, the younger brother of a business tycoon Sanjeev Arora (Mohnish Behl), is an aspiring CEO and is eager to make his first million. He starts on his own after ideological disputes with Sanjeev. He joins the airline business and keeps on doing well until a stock market crash almost ruins him. When under serious debt, he gets the opportunity to clear them but has to deceive his brother for that. He initially agrees but then refuses to accept the money. It is then revealed that the money is Sanjeev Arora's.

Jai is the son of a respectable co-operative bank chairman and wants to become a powerful politician; Jai joins politics against his widowed mother's will. He rapidly climbs up the party ranks but to do so he has to do things which are against his will but important to beat his party's opposition. He willingly lets the opposition leader die of heart attack when he could have saved him. As a result, his mental condition is severely hampered and he spends many sleepless nights. He then has to visit a psychiatrist. After help from his psychiatrist he learns to get over his issues and ask for forgiveness to opposition leader wife to receive closure.

Ishita is the contributor of a leading gossip magazine Scandal and wants to make loads of cash. Following this, she traps a business tycoon named Raj Gujral (Raj Zutshi) with her beauty and strategy. She leaks her photos with him on the front page of Scandal. When his wife sees it, she divorces him. Raj looks forward to woo Ishita but she doesn't take his calls. Finally she marries him after learning about their divorce. Over the time she realizes that she cannot find her way into receiving loyalty from Raj. And finds herself accustomed to a lifestyle feeling trapped in it. But eventually gathers guts to get over her obsession of money and divorces him.

Monica longs to hit big on the Bollywood screen. Although she has a boyfriend — Mohit Aggarwal (Anuj Sawhney) — she has an affair with a film star called Rohit Kumar (Rajat Bedi). She lies until Mohit discovers her sleeping with Rohit Kumar. Mohit commits suicide. The next day, she confesses everything in front of the media and takes all the blame for his death. She goes abroad afterwards out of embarrassment.

Manish a struggling writer, gets happily married and has a daughter. He writes the best-selling Life Mein Kabhie Kabhiee. The book was the story about the lives of the five best friends: how their lives changed and how they understood the significance of their lives.

Cast
 Dino Morea: Rajeev Arora
 Aftab Shivdasani: Manish Gupta
 Anjori Alagh: Ishita Sharma / Ishita Raj Gujral
 Nauheed Cyrusi: Monica Seth
 Sameer Dattani: Jai Gokhale, who later becomes MP
 Yashpal Sharma (actor) as Minister Gwaneshwar
 Nishigandha Wad Kanta Prasad's wife
 Madan Joshi as Chief Minister Kanta Prasad

Supporting cast
 Anuj Sawhney: Mohit Agarwal (Monica's boyfriend)
 Mohnish Behl: Sanjiv Arora (Rajiv's elder brother)
 Koel Puri: Richa Gupta (Manish's wife)
 Raj Zutshi: Raj Gujral (Ishita's husband)
 Rajat Bedi: Rohit Kumar
 Nikita Anand: Rajiv's girlfriend
 Pinky Harwani: Jai's counsellor

Music
 Hum Khushi Ki Chah Mein : Zubeen Garg
 Gehra Gehra : Sunidhi Chauhan.
 No Problem : Remo Fernandes
 Valha Valha : Shaan, Sunidhi Chauhan,   Mahalaxmi Iyer, Shamit (The song is adapted from the Egyptian singer Amr Diab (El Alem Allah - album "Tamally Maak" in 2000)).
 Hum Tum Hum Tum : KK, Gayatri Iyer
 Hum Khushi Ki Chah Mein (Rock Mix) : Alka Yagnik, Zubeen Garg

References

External links
 

2007 films
2000s Hindi-language films
Films directed by Vikram Bhatt
2007 thriller films
Indian thriller films
Hindi-language thriller films